Straight from the Lab, is a 2003 bootleg mixtape consisting of previously unreleased songs by Eminem. The songs on the mixtape were scheduled to be released the following year on Eminem's fifth studio album, Encore.

Songs 
 "Can-I-Bitch" samples Slick Rick's song "Children's Story" in the first verse. It is also a word play on the title of Canibus's first album, entitled Can-I-Bus being a diss track to Canibus and is an answer song to the Pet Shop Boys' 2002 song "The Night I Fell in Love".
 "Bully" is a diss track aimed at rappers Benzino, Irv Gotti and Ja Rule.
 "Hailie's Revenge" (sometimes referred as "Do Rae Me"), is another diss track which features background vocals from Eminem's daughter Hailie Jade. It is a response to Ja Rule's song "Loose Change", in which Ja Rule has insulted Eminem's family, including Hailie.
 "We as Americans" (incorrectly titled "We Are Americans") was later included on a bonus disc for Eminem's fifth studio album, Encore. In 2022, Eminem stated that if the song had not leaked, it would have been the opening track on the album, followed by "Bully" as track two.
 "Love You More" was also included on the Encore bonus disc.
 "Come on In" (later retitled "6 in the Morning") was later released on D12's sophomore album, D12 World.

Track listing

Part 2 
A second mixtape, titled Straight from the Lab Part 2, leaked in 2011 consisting partly of unreleased songs from the shelved 2007 album, King Mathers.

 "Living Proof" and "Echo" were later released on Bad Meets Evil's debut album Hell: The Sequel.
 "Things Get Worse" was later released on B.o.B's Greatest Hits album.
 "Going Crazy" (later retitled "Fame") was later released on D12's 2011 mixtape, Return of the Dozen Vol. 2.

References 

Eminem compilation albums
2003 mixtape albums